is an athlete from Japan. He competes in triathlon.

Fukui competed at the first Olympic triathlon at the 2000 Summer Olympics. He took thirty-sixth place with a total time of 1:52:04.79.

References

1977 births
Japanese male triathletes
Living people
Olympic triathletes of Japan
Triathletes at the 2000 Summer Olympics
20th-century Japanese people
21st-century Japanese people